The History of the All-Union Communist Party (Bolsheviks): Short Course, translated to English under the title History of the Communist Party of the Soviet Union (Bolsheviks): Short Course, is a textbook on the history of the  All-Union Communist Party (Bolsheviks) (AUCP (B)), first published in 1938. Colloquially known as the Short Course, it became the most widely disseminated book during the time (until 1952) that Joseph Stalin served as the  General Secretary of the  Central Committee of the AUCP (B) and one of the most important works elucidating Marxism–Leninism.

Overview 
The book was commissioned by Stalin in 1935. Regarding the motives for compiling it, Robert Service quoted a Bolshevik official who said there was a need for a book which "instead of the Bible" would "give a rigorous answer [...] [t]o the many important questions". At the time, the party was concerned with the abundance of publications about the AUCP (B)'s history and sought to have a single, simple and authoritative book on the subject. The book was written by a team of historians and party members, with the principal authors being Vilhelm Knorin, Pyotr Pospelov and Yemelyan Yaroslavsky. Stalin wrote the chapter about dialectical materialism. 

In 1937, a draft of the Short Course was submitted to Stalin, who in turn requested several revisions to the text, including more historical background. On 16 April, the Politburo decreed that Knoriņ, Pospelov and Yaroslavsky would be relieved from all their other party obligations for a period of four months in order to complete the Short Course.

Between 8 September and 17 September 1938, Pospelov, Yaroslavsky, Vyacheslav Molotov and Andrei Zhdanov (Knorin was arrested in the Great Purge and executed on 29 July 1938) met daily with Stalin in his office at the Kremlin to make the last edits to the manuscript. The first chapter appeared in Pravda on 9 September 1938 and the rest of the text was published in serial form, the last chapter on 19 September. On that day, the Politburo decided to have a first edition of six million copies, to be sold at a particularly low price—three rubles a copy, equivalent to the price of a liter and half of milk at the time. On 1 October, the book was released.

On 14 November, the Central Committee issued a resolution On Conduct of Party Propaganda in Connection with the Publication of the Short Course, stating it "ends all arbitrariness and confusion in the presentation of Party history" and turning the book into mandatory reading in the curriculum of all university students and attendants of party schools.

Until Stalin's death in March 1953, the Short Course was reprinted 301 times and had 42,816,000 copies issued in Russian alone. In addition, it was translated to 66 other languages. In Hungary, 530,000 copies were printed between 1948 and 1950. In Czechoslovakia, over 652,000 copies were printed from 1950 to 1954. It was the most widely disseminated work in Stalin's time and no communist publication broke its record until Quotations from Chairman Mao.

In 1956, Nikita Khrushchev formally repudiated the Short Course in his "On the Cult of Personality and Its Consequences" speech. A new authoritative history of the party written by a team headed by Boris Ponomarev was published in 1962 under the name The History of the Communist Party of the Soviet Union.

Changes in the text 
The version of the history of the party described in the first edition of 1938 was significantly changed to match Stalin's preferences and it changed during subsequent reprints, following the changes in party leadership. 

Veteran Bolshevik leaders like Nikolai Bukharin, Lev Kamenev, Alexei Rykov, Leon Trotsky and Grigory Zinovyev, who conflicted with Stalin and were killed in the 1930s were described as "mensheviks" who from the very beginning "opposed Lenin and the Bolshevik party". The names of Filipp Goloshchyokin and Nikolai Yezhov, initially described as "experienced leaders engaged in enlightening the Red Army" in 1938, were deleted from the book after both were arrested in 1939.

Leszek Kołakowski described the "Short Course" as "perfect manual of false history and doublethink":

Influence in China 
Although the Short Course was eventually rejected by the Soviet leadership during the Khrushchev Thaw, its formulations, especially the idea that class struggle not only continued, but intensified as the state moved towards socialism, continued to be of fundamental importance in China, where Mao Zedong repeatedly attacked his opponents in the Communist Party of China as "capitalist roaders" and agents of bourgeois, counter-revolutionary and Kuomintang conspiracies. Mao felt that the Short Course best combined the teachings of Karl Marx and Vladimir Lenin as well as being a blue print to applying communist ideals in the real world. China was continuing to grow into a Marxist–Leninist state and that fully happened in 1949, making almost one third of the population of the world under the rule of Marxism–Leninism.

References

External links 
 The Short Course (in English, 1938 International Publishers edition)
 The Short Course (in English, 1951 Soviet edition)
 The History of the CPSU (in Russian)

1938 non-fiction books
Communist Party of the Soviet Union
History books about the Soviet Union
History textbooks
Soviet internal politics
Soviet propaganda books
Works by Joseph Stalin